Michael David Lisch (born August 30, 1990) is an American soccer player.

Career

College
Lisch played college soccer at Wake Forest University between 2009 and 2012.

While at Wake Forest, Lisch also spent time playing for USL PDL club Austin Aztex.

After graduating in 2012, he transferred to the University of New Mexico where he played his final college season under coach Jeremy Fishbein.

Lisch led the 7th ranked Lobos to the 2013 NCAA Division I Men's Soccer Championship in Chester, Pennsylvania during his lone season at New Mexico.

Professional
Lisch was selected by Houston Dynamo with the 54th overall pick of the 2014 MLS SuperDraft.

Lisch made his professional debut on February 10, 2014 in a preseason friendly against FC Tucson.

References

1990 births
Living people
American soccer players
Wake Forest Demon Deacons men's soccer players
New Mexico Lobos men's soccer players
IMG Academy Bradenton players
Austin Aztex players
Houston Dynamo FC players
Pittsburgh Riverhounds SC players
Charleston Battery players
Charlotte Independence players
Association football goalkeepers
Soccer players from Austin, Texas
Houston Dynamo FC draft picks
USL League Two players
USL Championship players